The discography of the band Nile consists of nine studio albums, two compilations, three extended plays (EP), two demos, three singles, and five music videos. Nile is an American technical death metal band from Greenville, South Carolina formed in 1993. Since 2017, their formation consists of Karl Sanders (guitars, vocals), George Kollias (drums), Brad Parris (bass, vocals), and Brian Kingsland (guitars, vocals). Two years later, they followed up with Festivals of Atonement, an EP released through their own Anubis Records label. In 1996, Ramses Bringer of War was released, a three-track demo with the title inspired by Gustav Holst's classical work "Mars, Bringer of War". The following year, the Ramses demo was re-released by Visceral Productions on EP format.

In 1998, the band signed with Relapse Records and released Nile's debut album, Amongst the Catacombs of Nephren-Ka. After extensive touring to support their debut album, Relapse reissued the first two EPs in early 2000 as a compilation entitled In the Beginning, with remastered songs and new artwork. This compilation was followed by two studio albums: Black Seeds of Vengeance released the same year, and 2002's In Their Darkened Shrines. In 2004, Nile released their fourth studio album Annihilation of the Wicked, which debuted on Swedish charts at number 27. In 2007, they released Ithyphallic, debuting on the Billboard 200 at number 162. In 2009, the band released their sixth studio album, entitled Those Whom the Gods Detest. Their seventh album, At the Gate of Sethu, was released in 2012. Their eighth album, What Should Not Be Unearthed, was released in 2015. Their latest album, Vile Nilotic Rites, was released in 2019.

Albums

Studio albums

Compilation albums

EPs

Singles

Music videos

Notes

A  "Unas Slayer of the Gods" was sent to radio stations for them to play the song prior to the release of the album.
B  "Papyrus Containing the Spell to Preserve Its Possessor Against Attacks from He Who Is in the Water" is a digital-only single.
C  "Permitting the Noble Dead to Descend to the Underworld" was released as a split 7" picture disc along with Vader's song "We Are the Horde". Limited to 333 copies.

References 

General

Specific

External links 

 

Nile
Discographies of American artists